The 2020–21 Ukrainian Second League is the 30th since its establishment. The football competitions in the Second League kicked off on 6 September 2020, about half a month after promotion/relegation playoffs. The planned 12th week of the season that accomplished the first half took place on 21 November 2020, yet the extra week was provided for few games that were forced to be rescheduled before teams retired for the winter intermission. The second half is scheduled to restart on 19 March 2021.

Summary 
In this season, the bottom two teams of the First League will be relegated to the Second League. The top two teams from each group of the Second League will gain promotion to the First League for the next season.

Teams

Promoted teams 
Seven teams have been promoted from the 2019–20 Ukrainian Football Amateur League:
 Epitsentr Dunaivtsi – 2nd place of Group 1 (debut) 
 Karpaty Halych – 4th place of Group 1 (debut) 
 FC Chernihiv – 3rd place of Group 2 (debut)
 Rubikon Kyiv – 6th place of Group 2 (debut) 
 Dnipro Cherkasy – 9th place of Group 2  (returning after 12 seasons, last played season in 2008–09) 
 Yarud Mariupol – 4th place of Group 3 (debut) 
 Peremoha Dnipro – 7th place of Group 3 (debut, the club was admitted despite disciplinary sanctions from the UAF about the last season "beef") 

One reserve and one other team were added also without participation in the Ukrainian Football Amateur League:
 Volyn-2 Lutsk – (debut, based on Volyn U-19 Lutsk) 
 Metal Kharkiv – (debut)

Relegated teams 
Four teams have been relegated:
 Karpaty Lviv – 12th place in the 2019–20 Ukrainian Premier League (debut, the club was admitted despite being expelled from the Premier League for no show) 
 Balkany Zoria – 14th place in the 2019–20 Ukrainian First League (returning after 3 seasons, relegated on own initiative)
 Metalurh Zaporizhya – 15th place in the 2019–20 Ukrainian First League (returning after a season, lost relegation play-off)
 Cherkashchyna Cherkasy – 16th place in the 2019–20 Ukrainian First League (returning after a season, lost relegation play-off)

Withdrawn teams 
 Avanhard-2 Kramatorsk – withdrawn before the season
 Chornomorets-2 Odesa – withdrawn before the season
 FC Kalush, after failing to arrive for the game against Epitsentr, it was confirmed that the club will not host the game against Karpaty Lviv. The club withdrew even after paying their season's dues without playing a single game.
 Cherkashchyna Cherkasy – withdrawn during the winter break. Before the break the club played 10 games winning 5 of them, tying 4 and losing one game with goal difference having 14 scored and 7 allowed. Soon after the announcement, the newly elected President of PFL, Oleksandr Kadenko denied fact of withdrawal as no official request has been made. On 3 March 2021 the club has sent a letter confirming that it is leaving the competitions.

Merged and renamed teams 
 FC Kryvbas Kryvyi Rih – it was restructured from FC Hirnyk Kryvyi Rih. On 29 July 2020 the president of Hirnyk Kostiantyn Karamanits confirmed that his team is being renamed into Kryvbas-2020 next season. Later it changed to Kryvbas Kryvyi Rih. The club's rebranding was triggered on petition of President of Ukraine Volodymyr Zelensky, who is a native of Kryvyi Rih.
 Earlier in 2020, FC Chernihiv merged with Avanhard Koriukivka as Chernihiv-Avanhard and kept its original team Chernihiv-YSB during the 2019–20 Ukrainian Football Amateur League. During the season Avanhard Koriukivka had more points and even played in post season play-offs. In August 2020 to the Second League instead of the merged club was admitted FC Chernihiv only. There is no real procedure on promotion from the amateur championship and clubs are being selected regardless of final standings such as FC Dnipro Cherkasy or FC Peremoha Dnipro.
 SC Tavriya Simferopol merged with FC Tavriya Novotroitske.

Location map 
The following map displays the location of teams. Group A teams marked in red. Group B teams marked in green.

Stadiums

Managers

Managerial changes 

Notes:

Group A

Results

Notes:

Top goalscorers

Number of teams by region (Group A)

Group B

Results
 
Notes:

Top goalscorers

Number of teams by region (Group B)

Championship game
According to Article 8.4 of the season's regulations, there is expected to be a championship game. On 8 June 2021 a draw identified hosting club for the game.

Awards

Round awards

See also
 2020–21 Ukrainian Premier League
 2020–21 Ukrainian First League
 2020–21 Ukrainian Football Amateur League
 2020–21 Ukrainian Cup

References

External links

Ukrainian Second League seasons
2020–21 in Ukrainian association football leagues
Ukraine